Chrzanowo may refer to the following places:
Chrzanowo, Kuyavian-Pomeranian Voivodeship (north-central Poland)
Chrzanowo, Ciechanów County in Masovian Voivodeship (east-central Poland)
Chrzanowo, Podlaskie Voivodeship (north-east Poland)
Chrzanowo, Gmina Rzewnie in Masovian Voivodeship (east-central Poland)
Chrzanowo, Gmina Szelków in Masovian Voivodeship (east-central Poland)
Chrzanowo, Greater Poland Voivodeship (west-central Poland)
Chrzanowo, Pomeranian Voivodeship (north Poland)
Chrzanowo, Warmian-Masurian Voivodeship (north Poland)